The 2006 Chevy Rock & Roll 400 was a NASCAR Nextel Cup Series race held on September 9, 2006, at Richmond International Raceway in Richmond, Virginia. Contested over 400 laps on the three–quarter (1.2 km) short track, it was the 26th race of the 2006 NASCAR Nextel Cup Series season. Kevin Harvick of Richard Childress Racing won the race.

Background
In 1953, Richmond International Raceway hosted Grand National Series; Lee Petty won the race. Original track was paved in 1968. In 1988, track was re-designed into a D-shaped configuration, during spring and fall races.

The name for the raceway complex was "Strawberry Hill" until the Virginia State Fairgrounds site was bought out in 1999 and renamed the "Richmond International Raceway".

Qualifying

Results

Race Statistics
 Time of race: 2:57:37
 Average Speed: 
 Pole Speed: 
 Cautions: 7 for 48 laps
 Margin of Victory: 0.153
 Lead changes: 16
 Percent of race run under caution: 12%         
 Average green flag run: 44 laps

References

Chevy Rock and Roll 400
Chevy Rock and Roll 400
NASCAR races at Richmond Raceway
September 2006 sports events in the United States